The HPD ARX-03a, ARX-03b, and ARX-03c are Le Mans Prototypes race cars developed by Honda Performance Development in 2012.  The 03a model utilizes a Honda V8 engine for use in the LMP1 category, while the 03b uses a turbocharged V6 engine for the LMP2 category.  Three teams have already announced their use of the ARX-03 in the FIA World Endurance Championship and the American Le Mans Series, as well as at the 24 Hours of Le Mans.  Muscle Milk Pickett Racing have purchased an 03a for use in the American Le Mans Series, joined by two 03bs for Level 5 Motorsports.  In the 2014 FIA World Endurance Championship, Strakka Racing and JRM Racing campaigned a single 03a each, joined by a single-car 03b entry by Starworks Motorsport in LMP2.

Racing history

2012
The HPD ARX-03 made its racing debut at the 2012 12 Hours of Sebring. The race would be the opening round of both the American Le Mans Series and the brand new FIA World Endurance Championship seasons. Muscle Milk Pickett Racing campaign a brand new ARX-03a LMP1 car, while Level 5 Motorsports campaigned two LMP2 ARX-03bs in the American Le Mans Series. After some bad luck with a fueling hose at Sebring, the Muscle Milk team went on to win the next five races in a row as well as another win at Virginia International Raceway. At the seasons final race, Petit Le Mans, Lucas Luhr was hit by a GTC class Porsche. Despite repairs needed during the race, the team was able to complete 70% of the race in order to win points. Muscle Milk Pickett Racing won both the LMP1 drivers and team championships with just 5 points over their main rivals, Dyson Racing. The Level 5 Motorsports team took first in class at the Mobil 1 12 Hours of Sebring and went on to win 7 of the next 9 races, losing only at Mosport and Road America to their main rivals, Conquest Endurance. The team was able to secure the LMP2 Teams' Championship and Drivers' Championships.

Strakka Racing, JRM and Starworks Motorsport would contest the first series of the brand new FIA World Endurance Championship. The Starworks team would claim three class victories including the season opening 12 Hours of Sebring and the 24 Hours of Le Mans and claim the LMP2 trophy with their HPD ARX-03b. Strakka Racing and JRM, competing with ARX-03a's, would finish second and third in the LMP1 Privateer Trophy behind the Swiss Rebellion Racing squad with Strakka racing claiming just one class victory.

2013
Muscle Milk Pickett Racing would continue with the HPD ARX-03a for the first three rounds of the 2013 ALMS season before moving to the updated -03c package for the remainder of the year. The team would claim eight wins in ten races losing out to Rebellion Racing and Audi Sport Team Joest at Sebring and suffering an overheating issue that took them out of the season ending Petit Le Mans. Extreme Speed Motorsports would join the Level 5 Motorsports team in LMP2 with the ex-Starworks -03b and another brand new chassis for 2013. Level 5 would claim wins at every race except Long Beach where they were beat out by ESM. Muscle Milk claimed the LMP1 Teams' and Drivers' Championship and Level 5 claimed the LMP2 Teams' and Drivers' Championship.

Strakka Racing would be the only team to campaign an HPD car in the 2013 season of the FIA WEC and would only campaign the first three rounds. The team retired the car at Silverstone due to damage but would go on to finish second in the privateer ranks and Spa Francorchamps and first at Le Mans in front of rival Rebellion Racing.

Gallery

References

External links

 HPD ARX-03a - Racecar Engineering, HPD ARX-03a, 14 March 2012

ARX-03
Le Mans Prototypes
24 Hours of Le Mans race cars